| updated          = 3 November 2021

Wail Ezzine (born 5 April 1996)  is an Algerian judoka. He competed at the 2021 World Judo Championships in the -66 kg event.

He won gold at the 2019 African Games in the -66 kg event.

At the 2021 African Judo Championships held in Dakar, Senegal, he won the silver medal in the men's 66 kg event.

References

External links 
 Wail Ezzine at the International Judo Federation
 Wail Ezzine at JudoInside.com

Living people
1996 births
Algerian male judoka
Competitors at the 2019 African Games
African Games gold medalists for Algeria
African Games medalists in judo
21st-century Algerian people